West Uvean (also Uvean or Faga Ouvéa; Fagauvea in the vernacular) is a Polynesian outlier language spoken on the island of Ouvéa, in the Loyalty island group of New Caledonia, and in the capital of Nouméa. It has long been in contact with Iaai, the Southern Oceanic language also spoken on the same island. Consequently, four vowels have been added, and the syllable structure has become complex, allowing for final consonants.

West Uvea is the only Polynesian language to use a quinary numeral system. It is probably the original decimal Polynesian people influenced by the nearby Iaai people who used a quinary numeral system, and changed from a decimal system to a quinary one. There are two sets of numerals from 11 to 20, the second way was the archaic form. The word 'tupu' means 'sum', 'teanua' in 'tahi a teanua' means 'human body', 'nea' in 'tahi enea' means 'man'. Nowadays, the West Uvea or Faga Uvea people use French or Iaai numeral systems more frequently.

Name
The speakers designate their language by the name Fagauvea, which is also the name used in French.
The name West Uvean sometimes used in English is meant to distinguish the language from the related East Uvean or Wallisian, spoken on Wallis Island (Uvea).

Phonology

// is only heard in intervocalic position.

References

Futunic languages
Languages of New Caledonia